The Stadt Huys or Stadthuys (an old Dutch spelling, meaning city hall) may refer to the following:
 Stadt Huys (Albany), New York, United States
 Stadt Huys Site, New York City, New York, United States
 Stadthuys, Malacca, Malaysia